Dwayne Nix (born October 10, 1946) is a former American football player, in the position of tight end.  He was elected to the College Football Hall of Fame in 2003. He played in the National Association of Intercollegiate Athletics championship game. He served in the United States Marine Corps as a helicopter pilot, initially flying Bell UH-1 Hueys. He served in the Vietnam War and Gulf War, and retired from the Marine Corps reserves as a colonel.

1946 births
United States Marine Corps personnel of the Gulf War
Texas A&M–Kingsville Javelinas football players
College Football Hall of Fame inductees
Living people
People from Kingsville, Texas
United States Marine Corps officers
United States Marine Corps reservists
Military personnel from Texas